Peterston railway station served the village of Peterston-super-Ely in South Wales between 1858 and 1964.

History and description
Peterston first appeared in timetables in 1858. It was then a quiet station, serving a village of just 327 in 1901. In the 1930s, it had 16 employees. Like many other stations in this part of Wales, it saw passenger numbers fall in the postwar years. Peterston was subsequently de-staffed from 6 April 1959, and closed to goods in 1962. After this point, the only passenger trains which stopped there were the 7.00am from Swansea to Weston-super-Mare, and the 5.30pm service from Cardiff to Porthcawl. The station was listed for closure in  the Beeching Axe, and the services were withdrawn. Peterston had a goods loop, which closed in 1964.

References

Disused railway stations in Cardiff
Former Great Western Railway stations
Railway stations in Great Britain opened in 1858
Railway stations in Great Britain closed in 1964
Beeching closures in Wales
1858 establishments in Wales
1964 disestablishments in Wales